The Swindon Speedway team, also known as the Swindon Robins, are an English motorcycle speedway team established in 1949 that have competed primarily in the top division of speedway league competition in the United Kingdom. They are five times league champions of the United Kingdom. 

The club have raced on their home track at the Abbey Stadium, Lady Lane, Blunsdon since their inception.

History

1928–1949
The formation of the club followed the sport's prehistory in the town at the now-demolished Gorse Hill Aerodrome, where dirt track racing had taken place since 1928.

The birth of the Robins was a product of the partnership of Bristol speedway manager Reg Witcomb and businessman Bert Hearse. Under their direction, a  cinder track was built.

The first meeting, a non-league home challenge match, took place on 23 July 1949 against future rivals Oxford, and an official attendance figure of 8,000 was given, although employees of the club believe that 10,000 would be closer to the truth. The Robins lost their debut meeting 39–45 in a meeting that saw Ginger Nicholls top score for the home side with 11 points on his wedding day. In the process he won the first-ever race, was beaten by an opponent only once, and set the first-ever track record at 82.8 seconds. The team then joined the 1949 Speedway National League Division Three taking over the fixtures of the Hull Angels, who withdrew from the league. Swindon finished in 11th place.

1950–2009

The first silverware came to the club in 1956 and 1957; they won the 1956 Speedway National League Division Two and then the following year joined the highest league, that of the 1957 Speedway National League, where they secured back to back league titles. The next major success came during the 1967 British League season when Swindon won their second highest league title. Swindon finished with four riders with averages over eight, Barry Briggs topped the entire league with 11.05 but the contributions from Martin Ashby (8.83), Bob Kilby (8.61) and Mike Broadbank (8.55) were pivotal in the Swindon's success.

The club did not experience further success until they won the Div 2 KO Cup during the 2000 Premier League speedway season and nine years later during the 2009 Elite League speedway season the Robins finished first in the regular season table but lost in the play off final.

2010–2019 

Following difficult campaigns in 2010 and 2011, Swindon signed Denmark's Peter Kildemand, former world #5 Hans Andersen and Australian international Troy Batchelor, who rode for the Robins in 2008 and part of the 2009 season. Alun Rossiter also returned as team manager after a 2-year spell with Coventry, with whom he won the Elite League in 2010. In 2012, the Robins won the Elite League title after beating the Poole Pirates 95–89 on aggregate following a 45-year wait for glory.

In 2013, 2014 and 2015, the Robins made the semi-finals of the playoffs, but failed to advance further. At the start of the 2015 season, Swindon Robins No 1 Adrian Miedziński was injured in the first meeting at the Abbey vs Poole Pirates, with Peter Kildemand filling in on a temporary basis before the club signed Australian international Darcy Ward. However, Ward suffered a career-ending accident while riding in Poland, and Kildemand once again stepped in to complete the season.

The 2016 Swindon Robins team was nicknamed Roscos Roo's, because it contained five Australians in addition to the required two British reserves. In 2017, the Robins won the League Championship against Wolverhampton Wolves despite losing the first leg at their home track. 

A new stadium was planned to be built for the 2018 season. At the start of the 2019 season, the Abbey Stadium was to be reduced in size to 320 metres from its original 363 metres; the track record holder on the old track size was Leigh Adams, with a time of 63.86 seconds, on 31 August 2009.

2020–2023 
Due to the COVID-19 pandemic, the 2020 SGB Premiership was completely cancelled. In January 2021, the Robins confirmed their withdrawal from the 2021 season, citing uncertainty around the sport and the potential redevelopment of their stadium. In October 2021 the Robins' promoter, Terry Robins, confirmed that the team would not be fielding a team in the 2022 season due to uncertainty over when the new stadium would be completed. In December 2022, a stand-off continued between the council and builders Taylor Wimpey over the stadium's perimeter and its expected redevelopment. Around that time Clarke Osborne of Gaming International issued a press release calling for sites, seeking a 5,000 capacity stadium to host speedway, karting and car racing.

Season summary

Season summary (juniors)

Riders previous seasons

2019 team
 Jason Doyle 
 Troy Batchelor 
 Rasmus Jensen
 Adam Ellis 
 Tobiasz Musielak
 Claus Vissing
 Ellis Perks

2018 team

2017 team

2016 team

2010 team

2009 team

 (No. 8)

Also Rode:

 (as No. 8)

2008 team

 (No.8)

Also Rode:

 (as No.8)

2007 team

 (No.8)

Also rode:

2006 team

Club honours
National League Champions: 1957
British League Champions: 1967
Elite League Champions: 2012
SGB Premiership Champions: 2017, 2019
National League Division Two Champions: 1956
Premiership Supporters KO Cup Winners: 2019
Premier League KO Cup Winners: 2000
Premier League Four-Team Championship Winners: 2003
Young Shield Winners: 2000
Midland Cup Winners: 1967, 1968, 1994
Elite Shield Winners: 2008, 2018

Elite League Pairs Championship
2004 (Leigh Adams and Charlie Gjedde)
2005 (Leigh Adams and Lee Richardson)

British League Division Two Best Pairs
1994 (Tony Olsson and Tony Langdon)

Individual honours
World Champion
 Barry Briggs (1964 and 1966)
 Jason Doyle (2017)

World Under-21 Champion
 Peter Nahlin (1988) 
 Leigh Adams (1992)

World Ice Speedway Champion
 Erik Stenlund (1988)

British Speedway Championship
 Barry Briggs (1964, 1965, 1966, 1967 & 1969)
 Steve Bastable (1981)

British League Riders' Championship
 Barry Briggs (1965, 1966, 1967, 1968, 1969, 1970)

British League Division Two Riders Championship
 Gary Allan (1993)

All-time points scorers

Notable riders

References

External links
 
 Save Swindon Speedway BBC Action Network
 James Wright official website

Speedway Elite League teams
Sports clubs established in 1949
Sport in Swindon